"My Sweetheart Is Somewhere in France" is a World War I era song first released in 1917. Mary Earl composed the music and wrote the lyrics. Shapiro, Bernstein & Co. Inc. of New York City published the song. Elizabeth Spencer performed a version of the song that was released by the Victor record label.

It was written for voice and piano. On the cover is a woman looking down at a soldier writing a letter. Between them are the moon and stars.

The song is told from the point of view of a person whose significant other is in France, fighting the war. The chorus is as follows:

The sheet music can be found at Pritzker Military Museum & Library.

References

1917 songs
Songs of World War I
Songs about France
Songs written by Robert A. King (composer)